The 2021–22 Xavier Musketeers men's basketball team represented Xavier University during the 2021–22 NCAA Division I men's basketball season as a member of the Big East Conference. Led by fourth-year head coach Travis Steele for the first 32 games and interim head coach Jonas Hayes for the final four games, they played their home games at the Cintas Center in Cincinnati, Ohio. The Musketeers finished the season 23–13, 8–11 in Big East play to finish in a tie for seventh place. They lost in the first round of the Big East tournament to Butler. The team received an at-large bid to the National Invitation Tournament where they defeated Cleveland State, Florida, Vanderbilt, and St. Bonaventure to advance to the championship game. There they defeated Texas A&M to win the NIT championship. 

Head coach Travis Steele was fired on March 16, 2022, the day after the first win in the NIT. Assistant coach Jonas Hayes was named the interim head coach and coached the team for the four remaining games in the NIT. 

On March 19, the school named former Xavier and Arizona head coach Sean Miller the team's new head coach. Miller previously coached the Musketeers from 2004 to 2009.

Previous season
In a season limited due to the ongoing COVID-19 pandemic, the Musketeers finished the 2020–21 season 13–8, 6–7 in Big East play to finish tied for seventh place. They lost in the first round of the Big East tournament to Butler.

Offseason
On April 28, 2021, the NCAA officially adopted a measure that would allow athletes in all sports to transfer once without sitting out a season beginning with the 2021–22 season.

Departures

Incoming transfers

Recruiting classes

2021 recruiting class

2022 recruiting class

Roster

Schedule and results

|-
!colspan=9 style=| Exhibition

|-
!colspan=9 style=| Non-conference regular season

{{CBB schedule entry
| date          = November 21, 2021
| time          = 12:00 p.m.
| nonconf       = yes
| homecoming    =
| away          = 
| neutral       = 
| rank          = 
| opponent      = Norfolk State
| opprank       = 
| score         = 88–48
| site_stadium  = Cintas Center
| site_cityst   = Cincinnati, OH
| gamename      = 
| tv            = FS1
| highscorer    = Kunkel
| points        = 26
| highrebounder = Jones
| rebounds      = 13
| highassister  = 2 tied
| assists       = 6
| record        = 4–0
| overtime      =
| attend        = 9,361
}}

|-
!colspan=9 style=| Big East regular season

|-
!colspan=9 style=| Big East tournament

|-
!colspan=9 style=|NIT tournament

Source

Rankings

*AP does not release post-NCAA Tournament rankings.^Coaches do not release a Week 1 poll.''

Awards and honors

Big East Conference honors

All-Big East Honorable Mention
Jack Nunge

Sources

References

Xavier Musketeers men's basketball seasons
Xavier
Xavier
Xavier
Xavier
National Invitation Tournament championship seasons